Ambulance Ship is a 1979 science fiction short story collection by Northern Irish author James White, part of his Sector General series.

Stories 
"Contagion" – An ancient sleeper ship is found whose last occupants died only months before. The rescue ship and ambulance crews come down with a mysterious illness.
"Quarantine" – The sole survivor from a spacewreck is brought back to the hospital, and stuns everyone by downing half the surgical team.
"Recovery" – A ship is found with absolutely no visible markings. A torture corridor inside beats on whatever passes, including a violent non-sentient and a telepathic sentient who communicates with the ambulance staff about the Blind Ones' need.

The 1980 Corgi edition has "Spacebird" as the first story.

References

1979 short story collections
1970s science fiction works
Short story collections by James White (author)
Del Rey books
Science fiction short story collections